The Azov War or Crimean-Circassian War of 1501–1502 was a military conflict between the Crimean Khanate and the Kabardian Principality.

History 
In the spring of 1501, the Tatars organized a campaign against the western Circassians. The campaign ended with the defeat of the Tatars. As revenge, in the autumn of 1501, the Circassians raided the vicinity of the fortress of Azov. They stole the cattle and killed the chase. In response, in 1502, the Ottoman Turks organized a punitive campaign against the lands of the Circassians. But the campaign did not take place due to the death of the Kafsky governor.

References 

16th-century conflicts
16th century in the Crimean Khanate
Wars involving the Circassians
Military operations involving the Crimean Khanate